Irondequoit Bay State Marine Park is a  state park and boat launch located in Monroe County, New York, north of the City of Rochester. The park is operated by the Town of Irondqeuoit and primarily facilitates fishing and boating access to Irondequoit Bay and Lake Ontario.

Park description
Irondequoit Bay State Marine Park includes space and facilities for fishing, boating, geocaching, kayaking, and canoeing. The park is typically open daily from 7 a.m. until 11 p.m., except during the winter months (November 1 through March 31), when the park closes at 4 p.m. Monday through Thursday. The park's boat launch is open from 6 a.m. to 8 p.m., starting in late spring.

See also
 List of New York state parks

References

External links
 Monroe County Parks Department: Irondequoit Bay Marine Park
 New York State Parks: Irondequoit Bay State Marine Park

State parks of New York (state)
Marine parks of New York (state)
Parks in Monroe County, New York